Knipowitschia iljini is a species of goby Endemic to the Caspian Sea, where it inhabits the deep waters in the central part.  This species can reach a length of  TL. The specific name honours the taxonomist of Gobiiformes Boris Sergeevich Iljin (1889-1958), who researched the gobies of the Black and Caspian seas.

References

iljini
Fish of Asia
Fish of the Caspian Sea
Endemic fauna of the Caspian Sea
Fish described in 1931